"Baby Cruising Love" (stylized as "Baby cruising Love") is a double A-side single release by the Japanese group, Perfume. This single is the group's sixth major label single, and eleventh single including indies.

This single was released in two formats, a CD+DVD format (catalog entry TKCA-73310) with the PV for "Baby Cruising Love" on the DVD, and a CD-only format (catalog entry TKCA-73315).

Track listing

CD 
 "Baby Cruising Love" – 4:42
  – 4:40
 "Baby Cruising Love ~Original Instrumental~" – 4:41
 "Macaroni ~Original Instrumental~" – 4:38

DVD 
"Baby Cruising Love" video clip

Oricon ranks and sales

External links 
 Perfume Official Website

2008 singles
Perfume (Japanese band) songs
Songs written by Yasutaka Nakata
Song recordings produced by Yasutaka Nakata